Kramolna is a municipality and village in Náchod District in the Hradec Králové Region of the Czech Republic. It has about 1,100 inhabitants.

Administrative parts
Villages of Lhotky and Trubějov are administrative parts of Kramolna.

References

Villages in Náchod District